Emil Fenyvessy (31 March 1859 – 20 March 1924) was a Hungarian actor.

Emil Fenyvessy was born Emil Teitelbaum into a Jewish family in Ternye, Hungary (now, Terňa, Slovakia). He died in Budapest in 1924.

Selected filmography
 The Black Diamond (1917)
 Anna Karenina (1918)
 Yamata (1919)
 Oliver Twist (1919)
 White Rose (1919)
 Tragödie im Hause Habsburg (1924)

Bibliography
 Kulik, Karol. Alexander Korda: The Man Who Could Work Miracles. Virgin Books, 1990.

External links

1859 births
1924 deaths
Hungarian male film actors
Hungarian male stage actors
Hungarian male silent film actors
20th-century Hungarian male actors
Jewish Hungarian actors